Rubisa Patrol is an album by American jazz pianist Art Lande recorded in 1976 and released on the ECM label.

Reception
The Allmusic review by Michael G. Nastos awarded the album 4½ stars stating "This recording, with the short lived ensemble Rubisa Patrol, may someday be considered as one of the classic ECM recordings of all time... This is contemporary improvised music nonpareil, a relaxed, well-paced program that is here to soothe and reassure you".

Track listing
All compositions by Art Lande except as indicated
 "Celestial Guests/Many Chinas" (Mark Isham/Traditional) - 9:57 
 "Jaimi's Birthday Song" - 3:39 
 "Romany" (Glenn Cronkhite) - 8:42 
 "Bulgarian Folk Tune" (Traditional) - 1:00 
 "Corinthian Melodies" - 8:37 
 "For Nancy" (Isham) - 6:06 
 "Jaimi's Birthday Song" - 2:48 
 "A Monk in His Simple Room" - 5:16 
Recorded at the Talent Studio in Oslo, Norway in May 1976

Personnel
Art Lande — piano
Mark Isham — trumpet, flugelhorn soprano saxophone
Bill Douglass — bass, flute, bamboo flute
Glenn Cronkhite — drums, percussion

References

ECM Records albums
Art Lande albums
1976 albums
Albums produced by Manfred Eicher